Guwahati–Dekargaon Intercity Express is an intercity train belonging to Northeast Frontier Railway zone that runs between Kamakhya Junction and . It is currently being operated with 15815/15816 train numbers on a daily basis.

Service

The 15815/Kamakhya–Dekargaon Intercity Express has an average speed of 41 km/hr and covers 183 km in 4h 25m. The 15816/Dekargaon–Kamakhya Intercity Express has an average speed of 40 km/hr and covers 183 km in 4h 35m.

Route and halts

Coach composition

The train has standard ICF rakes with max speed of 110 kmph. The train consists of 12 coaches:

 10 General
 2 Second-class Luggage/parcel van

Traction

Both trains are hauled by a Guwahati Loco Shed-based WDM-3A or  WDM-3D diesel locomotive from Guwahati to Tezpur and vice versa.

See also 

The train shares its rake with:

 55823/55824 Rangapara North–Dekargaon Passenger
 55861/55862 Rangiya–Dekargaon Passenger
 55813/55814 Dekargaon–Murkongselek Passenger
 55811/55812 Dhubri–Kamakhya Passenger

Direction reversal

The train reverses its direction 2 times:

See also 

 Kamakhya Junction railway station
 Dekargaon railway station
 Dekargaon–Murkongselek Passenger
 Rangapara North–Dekargaon Passenger
 Dhubri–Kamakhya Passenger
 Rangiya–Dekargaon Passenger

Notes

References

External links 
 15815/Kamakhya–Dekargaon Intercity Express India Rail Info
 15816/Dekargaon–Kamakhya Intercity Express India Rail Info

Transport in Guwahati
Transport in Tezpur
Rail transport in Assam
Intercity Express (Indian Railways) trains
Railway services introduced in 2014